Five ships of the French Navy have borne the name Vésuve in honour of Mount Vesuvius:

Ships 
 Vésuve (1793), a gunbrig, lead ship of her class. Captured in 1795 and taken into the British Royal Navy as HMS Vesuve; sold 1802.
 , a tartane.
 , a bomb vessel, lead ship of her class.

See also

Notes and references

Notes

References

Bibliography 
 

French Navy ship names